False Start was a power pop/rock band from Auckland, New Zealand, that formed in the winter of 2005. They were signed to Deadboy Records/Universal.

History 

In June 2005, False Start won the Henderson regional heat of Battle of the Bands, going on to claim first equal in the Primal final, out of over a hundred Auckland bands. Adding to their early success, False Start's Goodbye Summer EP sold out on the first night of sales, their record debuting at No. 3 on the Real Groovy National chart. Shortly after False Start signed to Deadboy Records with distribution/backing from Universal Music NZ.

They released their first single, "Don't Walk Away" from the EP titled Goodbye Summer EP and a mini album entitled Adore Tu Ser..... There is also a four-track acoustic mini album titled Tealight For Burma.

Since forming their band, False Start have shared the stage with numerous local and international acts such as Fall Out Boy, Good Charlotte, Story of the Year, Funeral for a Friend, Aiden, Rise Against, The Used and many more. They have also toured extensively throughout New Zealand and Australia.

False Start played at the Auckland Big Day Out 2008 on the Local Produce Stage.  False Start also did a cover of "4ever" by The Veronicas.

In August 2008, False Start released their second studio album named Through The Looking Glass which includes the single "Four Letter Lie". The band opened for Escape The Fate in support of this album.

In September 2008, Vaughn announced he was leaving along with David a few months later in November.

On 3 June 2010, False Start posted on their Myspace that 2010 would be their last year as a band before breaking up, each member going their separate ways.

False Start reunited with the original lineup in April 2017 for a show in Auckland.

Discography

Studio albums
Adore Tu Ser
Through The Looking Glass

EPs
Goodbye Summer EP
Beginnings...

Other albums
Tealight For Burma

Singles

Band members 
Andrew Morrison – Vocals
Jim Marshall – Guitar
Kev Roberts – Drums
David Wong – Bass
Vaughn Phillips – Guitar

Past members

Ashley Wills 
Pascal Jarry 
Craigen Durrant

References

External links 
Official Myspace
Official Webstore
Official Buzznet

New Zealand rock music groups
Power pop groups